This list of Atlantic Coast Conference business schools outlines the business schools hosted by the 15 universities of the Atlantic Coast Conference (ACC). All 15 members of the ACC host business schools, and two, the University of Virginia and the University of Pittsburgh, have separate schools or colleges for their graduate and undergraduate business programs.

Although originally founded as an athletic conference, members of the ACC participate in the Atlantic Coast Conference Academic Consortium (ACCAC) which provides a vehicle for inter-institutional academic and administrative collaboration between member universities. Programs of the ACCAC include research conferences, faculty and student leadership programs, and the ACC Inventure Prize, a Shark Tank-like innovation competition for teams of students from ACC universities who are judged on quality of idea, business model, entrepreneurship, and probability of success.

U.S. News & World Report ranks Duke University's Fuqua School of Business as best in the ACC at number ten in the nation for its MBA program and sixth in the nation for its Executive MBA program, while the University of North Carolina at Chapel Hill's Kenan–Flagler Business School ranks first in the nation for on-line MBA programs. The University of Virginia and the University of North Carolina at Chapel Hill tie for the top undergraduate business programs in the conference, both at number seven nationally, according to US News.  The first business program founded at an ACC member university was at the University of Pittsburgh which can trace its business programs back to 1907 when it initiated business education in its former Evening School of Economics, Accounts, and Finance.

See also
List of business schools in the United States
List of United States graduate business school rankings

References

External links
 ACC Academic Consortium

ACC
ACC
Atlantic Coast Conference